Singapore is an island city-state in Southeast Asia.

Singapore, Singapur, Singapura, Sin-ka-pho, Sim-gia-bo, Xinjiapo, Singhapura, Singhpur, Singhpura, Singpur, Sinhapura and Simhapura (all from Sanskrit सिंहपुर (IAST: Siṃhapura)) may also refer to:

Places

Singapore
City of Singapore (historical entity), a former city in the central part of the Singapore island
 Colony of Singapore, a colony of British Empire on the Singapore island. Received internal self-governance in the 1950s by State of Singapore Act. Joined Malaysia for a short time as a state before independence from it in the 1960s.
Kingdom of Singapura, a 14th-century Malay kingdom centered in modern-day Singapore
Pulau Ujong or Singapore Island, the mainland island of Singapore

India
Singapur, Adilabad district, a census town in Adilabad district, Andhra Pradesh, India
Singpur, a settlement in Gujarat, India
Singhpora-Pattan, a town in Jammu and Kashmir, India
Singapur, a settlement in Raichur district, Karnataka, India
Singapur, in Mancherial district in Telangana, India
Singpur, a settlement in Madhya Pradesh, India
Singpur, a settlement in Maharashtra, India
Singpur, a settlement in Orissa, India
Singhpur, Rajasthan, a village in Rajasthan, India
Singapura, a settlement in Rajasthan, India
Singhpur, Raebareli, a village in Uttar Pradesh, India
Singhpur, Punjab, a village in Jalandhar district of Punjab, India
Singhpuria Misl, one of the original Sikh Misls in Punjab
Singhpur railway station, railway station on Bilaspur–Katni line under Bilaspur railway division of South East Central Railway Zone of Indian Railways

Other places
Singpur, a settlement in Barisal Division, Bangladesh
Singaparna, a settlement in West Java, Indonesia
Singhpura, Pakistan, a town in Punjab, Pakistan
Singapore (South Africa), a settlement in Limpopo province, South Africa
Singapore, Michigan, a ghost town in the United States
Sinhapura, a legendary city located in India, Malaysia or Thailand, mentioned in Sinhalese Buddhist texts
Singapore Island, one of the many artificial islands making up The World archipelago in the United Arab Emirates

Film
Singapore (1947 film), an American film starring Ava Gardner
Singapore (1960 film), a Bollywood film starring Shammi Kapoor

Music
Singapur (album), by Terminaator, 1998
"Singapore" (song), by 2 Plus 1, 1980
"Singapore", a song by Tom Waits from Rain Dogs
"Singapore", a song by Girls Aloud from The Sound of Girls Aloud: The Greatest Hits

Other uses
Singapore Airlines, the national airline of Singapore, based at Singapore’s Changi Airport
Singapura cat, a breed of cat
Singapore Sling, a gin sling drink
Singapore (horse), a Thoroughbred racehorse
Sincapore, one of several vessels using a 19th century variant of the name

See also
Central Area, Singapore, an area in the Central Region of Singapore (also called the "City Area" or informally "the City")
"On a Little Street in Singapore", a jazz song written by Billy Hill and Peter DeRose
Road to Singapore (1940), an American film
Short Singapore, a series of British military flying boats
Leopolis (disambiguation), also means "lion city"
Singaporean language